Zihguan District is a coastal suburban district of Kaohsiung City in southern Taiwan.

History
After the handover of Taiwan from Japan to the Republic of China in 1945, Zihguan was organized as a rural township of Kaohsiung County. On 25 December 2010, Kaohsiung County was merged with Kaohsiung City and Zihguan was upgraded to a district of the city.

Geography
 Area: 11.595 km2
 Population: 34,847 people (January 2023)

Administrative divisions
Ziguan District is divided into 15 villages and 286 neighborhoods.

 Chidong Village
 Chikan Village
 Chixi Village
 Dashe Village
 Dianbao Village
 Jiadong Village
 Like Village
 Tong'an Village
 Xinke Village
 Zhike Village
 Zhonglun Village
 Zihe Village
 Ziping Village
 Zixin Village
 Ziyi Village

Politics
The district is part of Kaohsiung City Constituency II electoral district for Legislative Yuan.

Economy
Northern Zihguan consists mostly on agriculture, while in the South consists mostly about fishery.

Tourist attractions
 Tong'an Temple (蚵子寮通安宫)

Notable natives
 Sun Shu-may, pop singer, actress and TV host

See also
 Kaohsiung

References

External links

 
 Tzukuan District Office, Kaohsiung City 

Districts of Kaohsiung